Acrolophus chonactis is a moth of the family Acrolophidae. It is found in Brazil.

References

chonactis
Moths described in 1932